Sannois is a commune in the northwestern suburbs of Paris, France. It is located 15.2 km. (9.4 miles) from the center of Paris, in the Val-d'Oise department in Île-de-France in northern France.

Population

Transport

Public transport
Sannois is served by Sannois station on the Transilien Paris-Saint-Lazare suburban rail line.

Roads
Sannois is served by the A15 and A115 motorways and the N14 national road between Paris, Pontoise and Normandy.

Sport
Sannois is home to the Parc des Sports Michel Hidalgo, where the local football team L'Entente SSG play their home games in France's Championnat National.

Points of interest
 The windmill, built in the 18th century, was classified as a monument historique by the French Ministry of Culture in 1975.
 Jardin botanique de Sannois des Plantes Médicinales

Notable people
 Cyrano de Bergerac is said to have died in Sannois.
 
 Louis de Robert (1871–1937), winner of the Prix Femina in 1911 died in Sannois.

See also
Communes of the Val-d'Oise department

References

External links

Official website 
Association of Mayors of the Val d'Oise 

Communes of Val-d'Oise